Thinozercon michaeli is a species of mite, placed in its own family, Thinozerconidae.

References

Mesostigmata